Arsen Avetisyan (born 8 October 1973) is a retired Armenian footballer who played as a forward.

Club career
Avetisyan has played for numerous clubs during his career. In 2006, he returned to Armenia to play for his former club Pyunik and became the main forward for the team. In 2008, he transferred to Kapan to play for Gandzasar after his contract with Pyunik had expired.

International career
Avetisyan made his debut for Armenia national football team in 1992, gaining 25 caps and scoring one goal. He announced his retirement from international football in 1998.

Honours
European Golden Boot 1995
Homenetmen Yerevan / Pyunik
Armenian Premier League: 5
 1992, 1995–96, 1996–97, 2006, 2007
Armenian Independence Cup: 1
 1996

References

External links
Profile at ffa.am

1973 births
Living people
Footballers from Yerevan
Armenian footballers
Armenia international footballers
Armenian expatriate footballers
FC Pyunik players
FC Ararat Yerevan players
FC Zhemchuzhina Sochi players
FC Gandzasar Kapan players
Armenian Premier League players
Belgian Pro League players
K. Berchem Sport players
Expatriate footballers in Belgium
Expatriate footballers in Russia
Association football forwards
Soviet footballers
Soviet Armenians
FC Mashuk-KMV Pyatigorsk players